The Caminho dos Gerais State Park   is a state park in the state of Minas Gerais, Brazil.
It protects a mountainous area with cerrado and caatinga vegetation that is an important source of water in a dry region.

Location

The Caminho dos Gerais State Park is divided between the municipalities of Espinosa: , Gameleiras: , Mamonas:  and Monte Azul:  in the north of Minas Gerais.

The park protects part of the Serra Geral, and is an extension of the Espinhaço Mountains.
Soils are mainly latosols, cambisols and quartzarenic neosols, with rocky outcrops. 
It rises dramatically from a landscape of vast plains.
Its ridges, gorges, rapids, waterfalls and beautiful views give it significant tourist potential.

History

Creation of the park was based on local demand, the quality of the environment, the scenic beauty and the potential for tourism.
The local civil organizations, municipal authorities and elected officials asked the IEF to protect the area, which is the only source of water now that burning the cerrado for charcoal and planting eucalyptus had dried up the other sources.
The Caminho dos Gerais State Park was created by governor Aécio Neves by state decree on 28 March 2007 with the purpose of protecting regional fauna, flora, and the sources of rivers and streams of the region, and of supporting and reconciling scientific, educational and recreational use with preservation of the natural heritage.

Environment

The environment in the region has been adversely affected by expansion of agriculture, livestock and eucalyptus plantations without concern about their impact, particularly in the areas of chapadas.
As a result, some flora and fauna are threatened with extinction, and some water courses have disappeared.
The park is in an area that is still in good condition and contains rare, endemic and endangered species.
The area has not been well studied by scientists.

There is a well-defined rainy period.
The park is the main source of water for the four municipalities, and also protects the sources of the Verde Pequeno River, a tributary of the Rio Verde Grande, which in turn is a tributary of the São Francisco River.
It holds the sources of streams and rivers such as the Gameleiras, Engenho, Boa Vista, Brejo, Coronel, Jacú das Piranhas, Poço Triste, Boqueirão do Encantado, Pé de Serra, Riacho Seco, Espera and Capivara.

Vegetation includes cerrado and caatinga dry forest.
The parks holds rare species such as Ipê (Tabebuia sp.), Jatobá (Hymenaea courbaril), Pequi (Caryocar brasiliense), Pacari (Lafoensia pacari), Pau santo (Kielmeyera sp.), Faveiro (Dimorphandra mollis) and Angico (Anadenanthera colubrina).

Notes

Sources

State parks of Brazil
Protected areas established in 2007
2007 establishments in Brazil
Protected areas of Minas Gerais